Monochamus nitens is a species of beetle in the family Cerambycidae. It was described by Henry Walter Bates in 1884.

References

nitens
Beetles described in 1884